John Patrick Whitesell is an American television and film director. He has directed numerous films such as Calendar Girl, Big Momma's House 2 and Holidate. He started his career as a film director in 1993.

Early life and education
Whitesell is the son of Patricia and John Patrick "Jack" Whitesell. He has five brothers Sean Whitesell, Christopher Whitesell, Thomas, Patrick Whitesell, and James Whitesell. Originally from Iowa Falls, Iowa, Whitesell attended Simpson College, before moving to New York City to study acting and directing at Circle in The Square.

Career
His credits include Law & Order, Roseanne, Doctor, Doctor, A Different World, Baby Boom, Coach and Tattingers.

He won a Daytime Emmy Award (Outstanding Direction For A Daytime Drama Series - John Whitesell, Bruce S. Barry, Matthew Diamond, Irene M. Pace, Robert D. Kochman, Joanne Rivituso, and Joanne Sedwick) for his work on CBS Daytime's Guiding Light, and worked on Another World (NBC Daytime), Texas and Search for Tomorrow (as executive producer in November 1985 - December 1986)."

Theatre
His theater credits include Happily Ever After, And That's the Way It Was, Solo for Two Voices, Towards Zero, and The Glass Menagerie.

Personal life
He is married to Jolie Barnett. They are members of Kehillat Israel.

Filmography as director
Calendar Girl (1993)
See Spot Run (2001)
Malibu's Most Wanted (2003)
Big Momma's House 2 (2006)
Deck the Halls (2006)
Big Mommas: Like Father, Like Son (2011)
Thunderstruck (2012)
Holidate (2020)

References

External links
http://www.luc.edu/umc/newsroom/inthenews/021306_5.pdf 
http://www.easterntalent.net/talent/bill-berner/ 
http://www.emmys.com/shows/john-larroquette-show

American television directors
Living people
Year of birth missing (living people)
People from Iowa Falls, Iowa
Film directors from Iowa
American Reconstructionist Jews
Whitesell family